The Madness of the Crowds is the fourth studio album by American pop punk band Ace Troubleshooter but their first on BEC's parent company, Tooth & Nail Records. It was released on June 5, 2002 in the UK and June 18 on the US.

The album's title is derived from Extraordinary Popular Delusions and the Madness of Crowds, a book by Charles Mackay. The album was recorded at The Loft with Tim Patalan.

Track listing
"The Madness of the Crowd" – 3:21
"2:00 Your Time" – 3:19
"Have It All" – 5:16
"Amanda" – 2:26
"Age of Gold" – 3:24
"Estella" – 4:54
"Out to Sea" – 2:56
"But for Grace" – 2:37
"Let's Go Away" – 3:39
"Numinous" – 4:38
"Your Reach" – 4:09

References 

Ace Troubleshooter albums
2002 albums
Tooth & Nail Records albums